GiFi is a French discount chain with nearly 500 stores, mostly in France.

It was founded in 1981 by Philippe Ginestet, who is the owner and chairman. His son Alexandre is the CEO.

In 2017, GiFi bought French discount chain Tati.

GiFi has an annual turnover of US$1.6 billion.

References

External links

Retail companies of France
Retail companies established in 1981